A list of films produced in Egypt in 1935. For an A-Z list of films currently on Wikipedia, see :Category:Egyptian films.

External links
 Egyptian films of 1935 at the Internet Movie Database
 Egyptian films of 1935 elCinema.com

Lists of Egyptian films by year
1935 in Egypt
Lists of 1935 films by country or language